Fredrick Obateru Akinruntan is a Nigerian monarch, the traditional ruler of Ugbo Kingdom, a town in Ilaje Local Government, Ondo State, southwestern Nigeria. He is an oil magnate and founder of Obat Oil, one of Nigeria's largest and leading privately held oil companies.

In March 2014 Forbes estimated his net worth as US$300 million. Obateru is ranked by Forbes magazine as the second richest King in Africa and the richest in Nigeria. He surpassed King Olubuse II, the Ooni of Ife, with $225 million and the Swaziland King Mswati III by over $200 million to become Africa's second richest king in 2014 behind Mohammed VI of Morocco.
He has a custom built 2012 Rolls-Royce similar to that of Queen Elizabeth II and on 14 January 2014, in an interview with Daily Post, he said "I have a $1 million watch, I use the same type of car like the Queen of England".

Obateru is the first black person to buy the 2014 model of Bentley automobile. In July 2013, in an interview with The Sun, Obateru said: "The first time I saw a car was 1961 in Sapele. At that time, Sir Festus Okotie-Eboh had a hotel in Sapele, Waterside Hotel. It was the first time I saw a hotel in my life. We used to describe hotels as bars. That was the first time I knew the difference between a hotel and a bar."

Background
Obateru was born in 1950 into the royal family of Sir Frederick Adetolugbo at Ugbo, a riverine area in Ilaje. He is the fourth child of a family of eight but lost his father in 1964 when he was 14 years old.

In 1982, there was a prophecy that Obateru would become the Olugbo of Ugbo Kingdom, a prophecy he never took seriously. Shortly after this prophecy, a chieftaincy title peculiar to him as the next Olugbo was conferred on his younger brother. This resulted in a lawsuit against the then-Olugbo by another royal family in the same lineage who demanded that he should be dethroned with the claim that his family had occupied the seat for over 200 years. The then-King lost the case and Obateru was appointed as the King in 2009, in accordance with the culture and traditions of Ugbo Kingdom.

Obat Oil
Obateru established Obat Oil in 1981. Today, the company has more than 50 gas stations across the six geopolitical zones of Nigeria and the company owns one of the largest tank farms in Africa, a modern storage facility able to store 65 million liters of petroleum products. Obateru appointed his second son, Prince Akinfemiwa Akinrutan, the managing director of the company. In May 2013, a Federal High Court sitting in Abuja ordered his immediate arrest on charges of disobeying a court order, following a suit filed and argued before the court by Barrister Iyke Ukadike.

References

1950 births
Living people
Businesspeople in the oil industry
Nigerian traditional rulers
Yoruba monarchs
Yoruba businesspeople
20th-century Nigerian businesspeople
21st-century Nigerian businesspeople
People from Ondo State